Cumnock, formerly known as Egypt, is an unincorporated community in northwestern Lee County, North Carolina, United States. It lies on Cumnock Road, about a mile north of U.S. Route 421.

Endor Iron Furnace is located near the community. It was listed on the National Register of Historic Places in 1974. The Deep River Camelback Truss Bridge was listed in 1995.

History
Egypt (now Cumnock) was the site of the Egypt Coal Mine which operated between 1855 and 1928.

Geography
Cumnock is located at  (35.5548727, -79.2377981), near the center of North Carolina.

External links
 Atlantic & Yadkin Railway
 
 Margaret Wicker: The Coal Glen Mine Disaster (Mentions Egypt mine and Coal Glen mine)
 North Carolina Highway Historical Marker H-41 Egypt Coal Mine
 Escape NC Cumnock,NC
Coal Deposits in the Deep River Field, Chatham, Lee, and Moore Counties, N.C.

References

Unincorporated communities in Lee County, North Carolina
Unincorporated communities in North Carolina